Karsten Oelsch (born 13 April 1971) is a German former gymnast. He competed in eight events at the 1996 Summer Olympics.

References

External links
 

1971 births
Living people
German male artistic gymnasts
Olympic gymnasts of Germany
Gymnasts at the 1996 Summer Olympics
People from Würzburg (district)
Sportspeople from Lower Franconia